Victor Duvant (3 March 1889 – 13 September 1963) was a French gymnast who competed in the 1920 Summer Olympics.

References

1889 births
1963 deaths
Sportspeople from Valenciennes
French male artistic gymnasts
Olympic gymnasts of France
Gymnasts at the 1920 Summer Olympics
Olympic bronze medalists for France
Olympic medalists in gymnastics
Medalists at the 1920 Summer Olympics
20th-century French people